Biyyala Venkat Papa Rao (also known as B.V.P Rao ) is an Indian film maker, a sports administrator and a former member of the Indian Administrative Service (IAS). His documentary short-length film Willing to Sacrifice won the National Film Award for Best Non-Feature Environment/Conservation/Preservation Film.

In March 2020, he resigned as a member of the governing body of Sports Authority of India (SAI). Rao is the brains behind the movement Clean Sports India which works on attempts to create a drug free sport.

Rao also worked for the United Nations for seven years to build post- war Governance and Peace in Kosovo. He is currently directing and producing feature films in India. His upcoming project is titled as Music School, with Ilaiyaraaja as composer.

As a film maker

He directed a documentary film called Willing to Sacrifice in 1998.

Art
Papa Rao Biyyala along with few other artists and art enthusiasts founded a trust called Art@Telangana which aims to promote art and artists of Telangana region. The trust brought out a high-quality coffee table booked titled Art@Telangana which features 100 years of art and history and the work of 150 artists in Telangana. They also have conducted several art camps over the last few years.

Other educational qualifications
 Diploma in Sustainable Development, Delaware University, USA and UN University, 1989.
 Masters in strategic studies, National Defence College, New Delhi, India, 1998.
 Post Graduate Diploma in Olympic Studies, International Olympic Academy, Greece, 1996.

References 

Living people
Indian filmmakers
Indian Administrative Service officers
Year of birth missing (living people)